The Women's Top Volley International is an international women's volleyball club cup competition played annually in Basel, Switzerland.

Format
In 2006, the competition was contested by six clubs. In the first round, the clubs were divided in two groups of three clubs each. The club's played against the other teams of their respective groups once. The two best placed teams of each group advanced to the semifinals. The clubs eliminated in the first round disputed the fifth place playoff. The clubs defeated in the semifinals disputed the third place playoff. The semifinal winners disputed the final.

List of champions

Titles by team

Titles by country

External links
  Women's Top Volley International Official Website

International volleyball competitions hosted by Switzerland
International women's volleyball competitions]
Recurring sporting events established in 1989
1989 establishments in Switzerland
Sport in Basel